Pérez-Llorca is a law firm founded in Madrid in 1983. The firm has 69 partners and more than 400 professionals.

It is headquartered in Madrid, and also has offices in Barcelona, London, New York, Brussels and Singapore. In 2017, the firm was recognised as ‘Spain Law Firm of the Year’ in the Chambers Europe Awards for the second time. The current senior partner of the firm is Pedro Pérez-Llorca.

History 

The firm was founded in 1983 by José Pedro Pérez-Llorca, who held a number of ministerial positions during the Government of Adolfo Suárez and was one of the seven contributors to the Spanish Constitution.

In 1995, the firm began its expansion with the opening of its office in Barcelona.

In 2006, Chambers & Partners awarded Pérez-Llorca with the award ‘Iberian Law Firm of the Year’.

In 2013, Pérez-Llorca moved its Madrid office to the Castelar building, located on the Paseo de la Castellana. The following year, the Barcelona office moved to the Alta Diagonal building, located on Avenida Diagonal.

In 2014, the firm continued its expansion and opened its first overseas office in London, where it practises Spanish law. One year later, in 2015, Pérez-Llorca established a presence in New York. That same year, the directory Chambers & Partners presented the firm with the award for ‘Spain Client Service’.

In 2017, Chambers & Partners presented Pérez-Llorca with the award for ‘Spain Law Firm of the Year’ for the second time.

In October 2018, the firm opened its second office in Madrid in the so-called Foster Tower, in the Cuatro Torres Business Area financial district.

Pérez-Llorca/IE Chair 

The Pérez-Llorca/IE Chair on Commercial Law is a top collaborative initiative launched by both a law firm and  the IE University. The chair has been running since 2010, and was born of Pérez-Llorca and IE’s commitment to applied research and dissemination of information in the area of Commercial Law from the perspective of international legal practice.

The aim of the chair is to combine the knowledge, experience and capabilities of a law firm and a university, and to share research with companies and law schools through work and by means of the joint activities organised by IE Law School and Pérez-Llorca.

The Pérez-Llorca Legal Journal 

The Pérez-Llorca Legal Journal was launched in 2019 with the aim of promoting legal debate and contributing to the improvement of the application of legal standards and institutions. This publication, written and developed by Pérez-Llorca’s practitioners, includes legal studies, practical collaborations and a section named “Article 20”, in which renowned public figures with differing points of view are given a platform.

The Journal seeks to promote the development of legal thinking, to contribute to the development of new criteria for the interpretation of the law and to promote the defence of legal security. It was first launched on 18 September 2019 at an event attended by various figures from the legal, political, business and cultural spheres.

Practice Areas 

Pérez-Llorca advises its clients in the following practice areas:

 National and International Arbitration
 
 Banking and Finance
 
 Private Equity
 
 Unfair Competition
 
 Corporate Compliance
 
 Bankruptcy and Insolvency
 
 Public Procurement
 
 Administrative Law
 
 Competition Law
 
 European Union Law
 
 Corporate Law
 
 Project Finance
 
 Tax
 
 Mergers and Acquisitions
 
 Corporate Governance
 
 Real Estate
 
 Labour Law
 
 Litigation before the ECJ (European Court of Justice)
 
 Civil and Commercial Litigation, Litigation against Public Administrations
 
 Environment
 
 Capital Markets
 
 Commercial Law
 
 White Collar Crime
 
 Copyright Law
 
 Intellectual Property
 
 Data Protection and E-Commerce
 
 Corporate Restructuring

The firm also provides advice through a desk which focuses on Latin America: LatAm Desk

Offices 
Pérez-Llorca has offices in Madrid, Barcelona, London and New York.

External links 

 Pérez-Llorca

References 

Law firms of Spain
1983 establishments in Spain
Law firms established in 1983